Gunnar Haugan (1 August 1925 – 29 September 2009) was a Norwegian character actor most commonly associated with his appearance on radio and television programs.

Biography
Haugan was born in Trondheim, Norway. He led many programs on Norwegian Broadcasting Corporation (NRK)  radio and television. 
Haugan was perhaps best known for his comedy role in the  popular humor and satire radio program Hørerøret which was broadcast by NRK from 1966-1967.

Haugan also appeared on the television comedy series Wesensteen from 1967 until 1970. He later appeared in the television shows Og takk for det (1969),  Fleksnes Fataliteter (1972)  and Herfra til Haglemoen (1980). In 1972, he  worked together with Rolv Wesenlund in the Norwegian satirical comedy  film Norske byggeklosser which was directed by Pål Bang-Hansen. Haugan died during  2009 in Oslo.

References

External links 
NRK Norgesglasset

ABC Startsiden

1925 births
2009 deaths
People from Trondheim
Norwegian male radio actors
Norwegian male comedians
Norwegian male television actors
Norwegian radio personalities
NRK people
20th-century comedians